Magis Institute is a non-profit educational organization dedicated to public education concerning the complementary relationship among the varied disciplines of physics, philosophy, reason, and faith.  It was founded by Jesuit priest and former Gonzaga University president Robert J. Spitzer, SJ .  The institute's primary outreaches are the Magis Center, The Purposeful Universe, and Credible Catholic.

History 
Fr. Robert Spitzer, SJ, a Jesuit priest, philosopher, educator, author, speaker, and retired President of Gonzaga University in Spokane, Washington, joined with Tim Busch to create the Magis Institute. Spitzer is currently the President of the Institute.

The Magis Center for Reason and Faith 
Magis Institute originally was created to be only a center for Catholic spirituality.  In 2008, Father Spitzer and his associates at Magis considered how they might offer a reasoned, scientific alternative viewpoint to those publicly expressed by "new atheism" writers such as Christopher Hitchens and Richard Dawkins.  As a result of these conversations, Father Spitzer began the Magis Center for Reason and Faith to provide a framework for the creation and distribution of materials expressing this alternative viewpoint.

On 3 September 2010, the Catholic News Agency featured Magis founder Father Spitzer in their response to the announcement of Stephen Hawking's new book touching on the subject of the origins of the universe.

On 10 September 2010, the institute was prominently mentioned on the CNN program Larry King Live. Father Spitzer appeared as a panelist on the program which featured Dr. Stephen Hawking,Hawking's literary collaborator, Leonard Mlodinow, and author Deepak Chopra in a one-hour prime-time discussion on the need for a transcendent creator of the universe.

Methods 
The institute, through Magis Center for Reason and Faith, is using five methods to leverage media to publicize their view of the compatibility of faith and reason:

Books 
Father Spitzer has published New Proofs for the Existence of God  The books authored by members of the institute will be "affordable (under $30.00 US for the most part) and tailored for the average reader within the planned demographic. The institute also helps to promote the books of other writers who share a similar viewpoint, e.g. William Lane Craig, working with a physicist named Simpson, published the Blackwell Commentary on Natural Theology.

Documentary films 
Former NBC News and "Today Show" producer Martha Cotton works with the Institute to make these complex issues more intelligible and to prompt discussions among high school students. The first documentary, "Cosmic Origins", features Nobel Laureate Arno Penzias, who discovered background radiation from the Big Bang. The video also features John Polkinghorne, who is an Anglican priest and a winner of the Templeton Prize.

New media 
The institute is reaching out on the Internet; it has a popular Facebook page, and releases frequent videos on YouTube. These offerings highlight the long history of scientific research done by members of the clergy over the centuries with a special focus on those who are currently active in their respective fields.

High school curriculum 
The institute's website offers a curriculum for high school students that is designed for use in parochial schools and church youth groups..

Adult education and college curricula 
The Institute arranged for a college course in conjunction with Benedictine College in Atchison, Kansas titled "Physics and Metaphysics in Dialogue". 

References

External links 
 magiscenter.com
magisreasonfaith.org
 magisspirituality.org
 Magis Facebook Page
Cosmic Origins documentary 
Larry King Live Transcript
 College Curriculum
 Benedictine College

History of Catholicism in the United States
Apologetics
Christian apologetics